Frasera, the green gentians, is a genus in the gentian family, native to North America and named for John Fraser, a Scottish botanist and colleague of Thomas Walter.

Taxonomy
Historically, Frasera has sometimes been considered part of Swertia, but molecular analysis of a number of Frasera species has shown them to form a monophyletic clade separate from the rest of Swertia.

Species
 Frasera ackermaniae
 Frasera albicaulis
 Frasera albomarginata
 Frasera caroliniensis
 Frasera coloradensis
 Frasera fastigiata
 Frasera gypsicola
 Frasera montana
 Frasera neglecta
 Frasera puberulenta
 Frasera pahutensis
 Frasera paniculata
 Frasera parryi
 Frasera speciosa
 Frasera tubulosa
 Frasera umpquaensis

References

 
Flora of North America
Gentianaceae genera